Hanna Westrin (born 25 November 1991) is a breaststroke Swedish swimmer from Sundsvall.

Clubs
Sundsvalls SS

References

1991 births
Living people
Swimmers at the 2008 Summer Olympics
People from Sundsvall
Olympic swimmers of Sweden
Sundsvalls SS swimmers
Swedish female breaststroke swimmers
Sportspeople from Västernorrland County
21st-century Swedish women